The 2018 Northern Iowa Panthers football team represented the University of Northern Iowa in the 2018 NCAA Division I FCS football season. The team was led by Mark Farley in his 18th season and played their home games in the UNI-Dome in Cedar Falls, Iowa as a member of the Missouri Valley Football Conference. They finished the season 7–6, 5–3 in MVFC play to finish in a tie for third place. They received an at-large bid to the FCS Playoffs, where they defeated Lamar in the first round before losing to UC Davis in the second round.

Previous season
The Panthers finished the 2017 season 8–5, 6–2 in MVFC play to finish in a tie for second place. The Panthers received an at-large bid to the FCS Playoffs where they defeated Monmouth in the first round before losing in the second round to South Dakota State.

Preseason

Preseason MVFC poll
The MVFC released their preseason poll on July 29, 2018, with the Panthers predicted to finish in third place.

Preseason All-MVFC Teams
The Panthers placed six players on the preseason all-MVFC teams.

Offense

1st team

Briley Moore – TE

2nd team

Marcus Weymiller – RB

Isaiah Weston – WR

Cal Twait – OL

Defense

1st team

Rickey Neal Jr. – LB

2nd team

Xavior Williams – DB

Personnel

Roster

Schedule

 Source: Schedule

Game summaries

at Montana

at Iowa

Hampton

at Indiana State

North Dakota State

at South Dakota

South Dakota State

at Western Illinois

Illinois State

at Youngstown State

Missouri State

FCS Playoffs

Lamar–First Round

at UC Davis–Second Round

Ranking movements

References

Northern Iowa
Northern Iowa Panthers football seasons
Northern Iowa
Northern Iowa Panthers football